Matthew Mansfield Neely (November 9, 1874January 18, 1958) was an American Democratic politician from West Virginia. He is the only West Virginian to serve in both houses of the United States Congress and as the Governor of West Virginia. He is also the only person to have held a full term in both Senate seats from the state.

Biography
He was born in Grove, West Virginia on November 9, 1874. He attended Salem College of West Virginia (now Salem International University), but did not earn a degree. At the outbreak of the Spanish–American War he entered the United States Army as a private. Following the war, he earned a law degree from West Virginia University. In 1903, he married Alberta Ramage.

He entered the practice of law in Fairmont, West Virginia and was elected its mayor in 1908. He was elected as a Congressman to an unexpired term in 1913 and was re-elected through 1918. In the 1920 election, he was defeated, due to his association with the policies of Woodrow Wilson.

He then ran for, and was elected to, the United States Senate in 1922 as a Democrat. He was defeated for re-election in 1928. He then ran for the state's other Senate seat in 1930 and was elected. He was re-elected in 1936. In 1940 he ran for governor and resigned the remaining two years of his Senate term.

He soon regretted his decision and strongly considered resigning to run for his old Senate seat in 1942. In later life he expressed strong regret for his term as governor. Upon the expiration of his term as governor in 1944, he ran for and was elected to his old House seat. He was, however, defeated for re-election in 1946.

In 1948, he was again elected to the Senate, beginning his third non-consecutive term there. He continued to serve until his death in 1958, after which he was interred in Fairmont's Woodlawn Cemetery.

He was a New Deal Democrat and advocate for organized labor and civil rights. During his terms in the Senate in the 1930s he sponsored "anti-lynching" legislation, but such legislation never passed. Neely did not sign the 1956 Southern Manifesto. When he returned to the Senate after a term as governor and another term in the House of representatives, he had lost his seniority, although he had many friends among the senior senators. He was assigned the Chairmanship of the U.S. Senate Committee on the District of Columbia, where he became the preeminent proponent of "home rule" for the District, effectively urging that the government of the District of Columbia be turned over to its majority of African-American citizens. He died in 1958, several years before the home rule he had sponsored finally passed both houses of Congress.

Neely was also a mentor of then West Virginia attorney George W. Crockett, Jr., and later Member of Congress, who credited Neely with converting him from a Lincoln Republican to a New Deal Democrat.

Neely was known through his political career as a master orator. In his honor, Fairmont State University sponsors an oratory contest in his name every year.

His grandson was Richard Neely, an author and politician who served as the chief justice of the West Virginia Supreme Court of Appeals.

Legislation 

Senator Neely introduced the first Department of Peace bill in 1935. Neely reintroduced the bill in 1937 and 1939. In 1937, along with senator Homer Bone and representative Warren Magnuson, Neely introduced the National Cancer Institute Act, which was signed into law by Franklin Roosevelt on August 5 of that year.  The Neely Anti-Block Booking Act gradually broke the control of the movie theaters by the studios.

See also 
 List of United States Congress members who died in office (1950–1999)

References

External links 

Biography of Matthew M. Neely
Inaugural Address of Matthew M. Neely

1874 births
1958 deaths
20th-century American lawyers
20th-century American politicians
American military personnel of the Spanish–American War
Burials at Woodlawn Cemetery (Fairmont, West Virginia)
Democratic Party members of the United States House of Representatives from West Virginia
Democratic Party governors of West Virginia
Democratic Party United States senators from West Virginia
Mayors of places in West Virginia
Military personnel from West Virginia
People from Doddridge County, West Virginia
Lawyers from Fairmont, West Virginia
Salem International University alumni
United States Army soldiers
West Virginia lawyers
West Virginia University alumni
Politicians from Fairmont, West Virginia